Brickellia rusbyi, the stinking brickellbush, is a North American species of flowering plants in the family Asteraceae. It is native to northern Mexico (Chihuahua, Sonora) and the southwestern United States (New Mexico, Arizona).

Brickellia rusbyi is a branching shrub up to 120 cm (36 inches) tall, growing from a woody base. It produces many small flower heads with yellow disc florets but no ray florets.

The species is named for American botanist Henry Hurd Rusby (1855-1940).

References

rusbyi
Flora of the Southwestern United States
Flora of Northwestern Mexico
Plants described in 1884